The 2006 European Canoe Slalom Championships took place in L'Argentière-la-Bessée, France between June 30 and July 2, 2006 under the auspices of the European Canoe Association (ECA). It was the 7th edition.

Medal summary

Men's results

Canoe

Kayak

Women's results

Kayak

Medal table

References
 Official results
 European Canoe Association

European Canoe Slalom Championships
European Canoe Slalom Championships
European Canoe Slalom Championships
European Canoe Slalom Championships
European Canoe Slalom Championships
Sport in Hautes-Alpes
Canoeing and kayaking competitions in France